Ezra White, LL.B. is a 2006 Australian short drama film written and directed by David Michod.

Plot 
Ezra White is a lawyer whose business and family, on paper, look perfect. But today is the worst day of his life.

Cast
Dan Wyllie as Ezra White
Leeanna Walsman as Louise White
Mirrah Foulkes as Teacher
Tia O'Neill as Tia White

Feature film portrayal
The character Ezra White also appeared in Michod's 2010 debut feature film Animal Kingdom, again played by Dan Wyllie. He appeared as the Cody family's lawyer who has a hatred for police officer Nathan Leckie played by Guy Pearce.

See also
 Cinema of Australia

References

External links 
 

2006 films
Australian drama short films
Australian independent films
2000s legal films
Films directed by David Michôd
Films set in Australia
Films shot in Australia
2006 short films
2000s English-language films
2000s Australian films